The following are the football (soccer) events of the year 2003 throughout the world.

Events
Confederations Cup: Host nation France wins a tournament marred by tragedy (see Deaths.)
UEFA Champions League: AC Milan wins 3–2 on penalties over Juventus, after a 0–0 draw at Old Trafford. This was AC Milan's 6th European Cup.
UEFA Cup: FC Porto wins 3–2 in the final against Celtic, after extra time, with a silver goal by Derlei. This is Porto's first UEFA Cup title.
European Super Cup: AC Milan beats FC Porto 1–0, winning the cup for the 4th time.
Copa Libertadores: Boca Juniors of Argentina won the cup for the fifth time against Santos of Brazil in a 5–1 aggregate.
Recopa Sudamericana: Olimpia of Paraguay won 2–0 in the final against San Lorenzo of Argentina.
FA Cup: Arsenal win 1–0 over Southampton
FA Premier league – Manchester United wins the Premier League by 5 points over Arsenal.
Women's World Cup: Germany wins the final against Sweden 2–1 after extra time.
22 January – Dutch club Sparta Rotterdam fires manager Dolf Roks, who is replaced on 7 February by former player Chris Dekker.
28 January – Head coach Robert Maaskant leaves Go Ahead Eagles and returns to RBC Roosendaal.
7 March – Mexican club Guadalajara appoints Hans Westerhof as their new technical director.
26 March – Manager Mike Snoei is fired by Dutch club Vitesse Arnhem to Ajax, and replaced by former player Edward Sturing.
17 June – Manchester United sells English football star David Beckham to Real Madrid for €35 million.
28 June – Italy's Piedmont wins the third UEFA Regions' Cup, beating France's Maine 2–1 in Heidenheim an der Brenz.
8 August – Satellite TV's Rupert Murdoch British Sky Broadcasting pay €510 million for transmission of FA Premier League seasons 2004–2007.
10 August – PSV wins the Johan Cruijff Schaal, the annual opening of the new season in the Eredivisie, by a 3–1 win over Utrecht in the Amsterdam ArenA.
25 September – Dutch club Zwolle sacks manager Peter Boeve.
1 October – Technical director Hans Westerhof is named head coach of Mexican club Guadalajara.
20 November – Manager Rinus Israël leaves ADO Den Haag and moves to Al Wahda in the United Arab Emirates. Lex Schoenmaker is his successor in The Hague.
28 November – In an Asian Cup qualifier between Iran and Lebanon, Ali Daei scores his 85th goal for the Iranian national team, breaking the record of Hungarian legend Ferenc Puskás.
14 December – Boca Juniors wins the Intercontinental Cup in Tokyo, Japan for the third time, by defeating Italy's AC Milan on penalties (3–1), after a 1–1 draw at the end of extra-time.

Winners national club championship

Africa
  – USM Alger
  – Cottonsport Garoua
  – ASEC Mimosas
  – Zamalek
  – Al-Ittihad
  – Stade Malien
  – Hassania Agadir
  – Enyimba
  – Espéance

Asia
  – Sun Hei
  – Sepahan
  – Yokohama F. Marinos
  – Al-Sadd
  – Seongnam Ilhwa Chunma
  – BEC Tero Sasana

Europe
  – Dinamo Zagreb
  – Copenhagen
  – Manchester United
  – Lyon
  – Bayern Munich
  – KR
 : Shelbourne
  – Juventus
 
 Eredivisie – PSV
 Eerste Divisie – Den Haag
  – Porto
  – CSKA Moscow
  – Partizan
  – Real Madrid
 
 Allsvenskan – Djurgården
 Svenska Cupen – Elfsborg
  – Beşiktaş

North and Central America
 – Brampton Hitmen (CPSL)

Clausura – Monterrey
Apertura – Pachuca
 – San Jose Earthquakes (MLS)

South America
 Argentina
2002–03 Clausura – River Plate
2003–04 Apertura – Boca Juniors
 Bolivia – Bolívar
Torneo Apertura – The Strongest
Torneo Clausura – The Strongest
 Brazil – Cruzeiro
 Colombia – Once Caldas
 Ecuador – LDU Quito
 Paraguay – Club Libertad
 Uruguay – Peñarol
  Club Alianza Lima

International tournaments
 UNCAF Nations Cup in Panama (9–23 February 2003)
 
 
 
 Baltic Cup in Estonia (3–5 July 2003)
 
 
 
 Pan American Games in Santo Domingo, Dominican Republic (2–15 August 2003)
Men's Tournament
 
 
 
Women's Tournament
  Brazil
  Canada
  Mexico
 FIFA U-20 World Cup in United Arab Emirates (27 November – 19 December 2003)
 
 
 
 FIFA U-17 World Championship in Finland (13–30 August 2003)
 
 
 
 Afro–Asian Games in Hyderabad, India (22–31 October 2003)

National team results

Europe





South America





Births	
 9 January – Ricardo Pepi, US international
 18 January – Devyne Rensch, Dutch international
 19 January – Ilaix Moriba, Guinean international
 21 January – Hannibal Mejbri, Tunisian international
 23 March – Ísak Bergmann Jóhannesson, Icelandic international
 4 April – Harvey Elliott, English footballer  
 12 April – Simon Ngapandouetnbu, Cameroonian footballer
 19 April – Rareș Ilie, Romanian youth international
 21 April – Xavi Simons, Dutch footballer
 27 April – Zidane Iqbal, Iraqi international
 1 May – Charlie Savage, Welsh international
 2 May – Marcos Leonardo, Brazilian youth international
 4 May – Florian Wirtz, German international
 7 May – Kevin Paredes, US youth international
 31 May – Benjamin Šeško, Slovenian youth international
 2 June – Yusuf Demir, Austrian-Turkish footballer
 28 June – Brandon Aguilera, Costa Rican international
 29 June – Jude Bellingham, English international
 12 August – Martín Luciano, Argentine club footballer
 7 ovember – Milos Kerkez, Hungarian international

Deaths

January
 10 January – Julinho (73), Brazilian footballer

February
 26 February – Antoni Torres (59), Spanish footballer and manager
 28 February – Albert Batteux (83), French footballer

April
 17 April – Jean-Pierre Dogliani (60), French footballer
 24 April – Gino Orlando, Brazilian forward, 9 times capped for the Brazil national football team. (73)

June
 26 June – Marc-Vivien Foé (28), Cameroonian footballer

July
 31 July – John Aston, Sr., English defender, England squad member at the 1950 FIFA World Cup. (81)
 31 July – Bigode, Brazilian defender, runner-up at the 1950 FIFA World Cup. (81)

August
 1 August – Guy Thys (80), Belgian footballer and manager
 8 August – Jimmy Davis (21), English footballer
 13 August – Lothar Emmerich (61), German footballer
 14 August – Helmut Rahn (73), German footballer
 31 August – Pierre Cahuzac (76), French footballer

October
 1 October – Cheung Yiu Lun (25), Hong Kong footballer

November
 21 November – Emil Pažický (76), Slovak footballer

References

 
Association football by year